The 1984 Florida Federal Open  was a women's tennis tournament played on outdoor hard courts at the Innisbrook Resort in Tampa, Florida in the United States that was part of the 1984 Virginia Slims World Championship Series. The tournament was held from October 8 through October 14, 1984. Seventh-seeded Michelle Casati won the singles title.

Finals

Singles
 Michelle Torres defeated  Carling Bassett 6–1, 7–6(7–4)

Doubles
 Carling Bassett /  Elizabeth Smylie defeated  Mary-Lou Daniels /  Wendy White-Prausa 6–4, 6–3
 It was Bassett-Seguso's 1st title of the year and the 2nd of her career. It was Smylie's 4th title of the year and the 8th of her career.

References

External links
 ITF tournament edition details

Eckerd Open
Florida Federal Open
Florida Federal Open
20th century in Tampa, Florida
Sports competitions in Tampa, Florida
Florida Federal Open
Florida Federal Open